The Galik script (Ali-Gali üseg) is an extension to the traditional Mongolian script. It was created in 1587 by the translator and scholar Ayuush Güüsh, inspired by the third Dalai Lama, Sonam Gyatso. He added extra characters for transcribing Tibetan and Sanskrit terms when translating religious texts, and later also from Chinese. Some of those characters are still in use today for writing foreign names.

Some authors (particularly historic ones like Isaac Taylor in his The Alphabet: an account of the origin and development of letters, 1883) don't distinguish between the Galik and standard Mongolian alphabets.

To ensure that most text in the script displays correctly in your browser, the text sample below should resemble its image counterpart. Additional notes on the affected characters and their desired components are provided in the tables further down. For relevant terminology, see Mongolian script § Components.

Letters

Symbols & diacritics

Notes

References 

Mongolian writing systems